The 1967 World Lacrosse Championship was the third World Lacrosse Championship for men's field lacrosse teams and was played in Toronto, Canada during May 1967. The United States won the round robin tournament.

The United States were represented by their National Champions the Mount Washington Lacrosse Club from Baltimore. They beat England, Canada, and Australia. Canada was represented by box lacrosse players from the Peterborough Petes and Green Gaels.

Results

|}

Standings

References

1967
1967
International sports competitions in Toronto